Gershom ben Solomon Kohen (died c. 1544) (also known as Gershon ben Solomon Cohen and Gershom Kohen Katz) was among the first printers of Hebrew books in Prague. He was the founder of the Gersonides, a dynasty of Ashkenazi Jewish printers. Mid-career, he attained rights to be an exclusive printer of Hebrew books in Bohemia authorized to produce Hebrew books.

Personal life
Based upon his name, he was the son of Solomon Kohen. Kohen lived in Prague by 1509, when he was a tax collector. His relatives lived in České Budějovice (about 150 miles from Prague) and Krakow (about 530 miles east of Prague). 

He married Května (Tzemah), the daughter of Eva. He owned a house in 1517, his wife purchased another house for her and their children in 1521, and he expanded the original house in 1522. Kohen and Eva had five sons: Solomon, Mordecai, Moses, Judah, and Benjamin.

Ferdinand, King of Bohemia banished Jews from Bohemia in September 1541, requiring them to leave by November 11, 1541. Kohen was one of the rare individuals to receive a geleitbrief, a letter of safe conduct, to give them more time to arrange their affairs to leave Bohemia. He was still in Prague in 1542 and in January 1544. He is said to have died by March 1, 1545, when he was thought to be at least 60 years of age, but he is also said to have worked as a printer in Heddernheim in 1546.

Printer

Kohen published religious books in Hebrew, such as Pentateuchs (Torahs), Talmudic works, and prayer books for people in Prague and across East-Central Europe, such as Poland and Germany.

After 1512 or in 1514, Kohen joined a consortium in Prague with the objective of printing Hebrew books and became its leading member. They ran the first printing press for Hebrew books in Eastern and Central Europe. The group included two financial backers and four craftsmen. 

Kohen used ornaments in his printed works, such as birds, lions, angels, and municipal coat of arms. He produced works with a new cursive rabbinic type and used German square. To do so, in 1514 Kohen invested in equipment to add illustrations and type for new fonts. Woodblocks were commissioned to print incipits, borders, illustrations, and emblems of local towns. New types were cast in several sizes. The printed three works before they disbanded, a Siddur in 1515, another in 1519, and a Mahzor in 1522. Books published by the consortium had Kohen's printer's mark of outstretched hands, the symbol of a Priestly Blessing for the Kohen family, a priestly class of which Kohen was a member. In addition, of the printers identified on works that they published between 1514 and 1522, Kohen's name was always listed first. The group produced works that surpassed those produced by printers of Christian books in Prague.

His print shop produced what the Library of Congress called a "magnificent Bible" by 1518. Ḥayyim ben David Schwartz joined him in 1518. 

In 1522, the Prague consortium was disbanded. Kohen and his brother Gronem founded their own printing press. In 1526, the brothers published the Haggadah and Yotzerot. They obtained exclusive rights to print Hebrew books in Bohemia in 1527 from Ferdinand, King of Bohemia. 

Two of Kohen's sons, Solomon and Mordecai, published editions of the Selihot in 1529 and 1530. Kohen's eldest sons print the Mahzor Helek ha-Sheni in 1529, with large square type and with black and white woodblock illustrations, because the illuminated manuscripts were expensive to produce and too costly for their buyers, which had become a trend by 1529, enabling more lay people to own books. The woodcut blocks were commissioned and made by Master IP, a Christian woodcutter. 

In the 1530s, the Kohens printed several prayer books and a new edition of the Humash. Two more sons entered the printing profession. Moses was a printer by 1534 and his brother Judah was a printer by 1541.

Kohen began printing in other locations, starting in 1530 when he collaborated on the printing of a Pentateuch in Oles in Silesia. In 1533 and 1534, he was in Augsburg where he published Megillot, Rashi on the Pentateuch, and a Haggadah. He published a German prayer-book and a letter-writer. He printed an edition of the Turim in 1540. Kohen published a pocket-sized Siddur, with his sons Moses and Judah on 1 May 1541. He printed Judeo-German versions of Kings in 1543 and Samuel the following year. Kohen published a few works in Heddernheim in 1546.

Gersonides
Kohen was the founder of a long line of printers into the late 1700s, the Gersonides or Gersonites.  His descendants, such as his son Mordecai, continued to follow the Prague tradition for printing, with rare and occasional touches influenced by Italy. They produced ethical and liturgical books in Judeo-German and Hebrew. After 1605, they had competitive pressure from the Bak family of printers who made improvements based upon those used by Italian printers.

The printers initially called themselves the Gershon family ("mishpahat ha-Gershuni"), sometimes clarifying that they descended from Gershom ben Solomon Kohen. They had several surnames, starting with Kohen and Katz. Later on, some family members took the surname Poppers. The Proops family of Amsterdam produced books with a priestly blessing device, as did their Kohen ancestor had beginning in 1514.

See also
 Early editions of the Hebrew Bible
 Hebrew incunabula
 Old master print

Notes

References

1540s deaths
People from Prague
16th-century printers
Jewish printing and publishing
Czech printers
16th-century Bohemian people

Year of birth unknown

Year of death uncertain